Treaty of Ceprano may refer to:

Treaty of Ceprano (1080), Pope Gregory VII established an alliance with Robert Guiscard and recognizes his conquests
Treaty of Ceprano (1230), established lines of reconciliation between Pope Gregory IX and Holy Roman Emperor Frederick II